Trisha Nicole Dykstra (born 23 July 1972) is an Australian retired basketball player in the Australian Women's National Basketball League and the Women's National Basketball Association (WNBA) of the United States.  She also played with the Australian national team during the three consecutive Summer Olympics, starting in 1996, including as captain at the 2004 Athens Olympics. Fallon started her career at age sixteen.

Fallon was selected by the Minnesota Lynx in the second round (19th pick overall) of the 1999 WNBA draft.  After the 1999 WNBA season, she was traded to the Phoenix Mercury along with Adia Barnes and Tonya Edwards in exchange for Marlies Askamp, Angela Aycock and Kristi Harrower on 27 October 1999.

Fallon was married to Stuart Dykstra on 29 July 2007 in Port Douglas, Queensland.

In 2010 Fallon was inducted into the Australian Basketball Hall of Fame.

Fallon has remained involved with basketball in Australia having worked for the Sydney Uni Flames and now with the Dandenong Rangers Basketball Association in Victoria. Fallon is also the Team Manager for the Australian Opals.

Fallon had a decorated basketball career and played 224 games for Australia at junior and senior level including 34 games as the Opals Captain.

Three-time Olympian (two silver and one bronze medal)
Two World Championships (bronze medal in 2002)
Maher Medal - International Player of the Year
Played 251 in the WNBL for three clubs, AIS, Melbourne and Sydney between 1989 and 2007
WNBL Youth Player of the Year - 1991
Four Time WNBL All-Star Selection 1996, 1997, 1999/00, 2004/05
WNBL Co-MVP in 1999/2000
Member of the WNBL's 25th Anniversary Team
Played with numerous teams in Europe including Spain's Ros Casares Valencia, with whome she won the Spanish Cup in 2003

WNBA career statistics

Regular season

|-
| align="left" | 1999
| align="left" | Minnesota
| 26 || 0 || 10.8 || .300 || .353 || .742 || 0.8 || 0.8 || 0.4 || 0.2 || 0.6 || 3.0
|-
| align="left" | 2001
| align="left" | Phoenix
| 31 || 16|| 27.1 || .490 || .405 || .815 || 2.5 || 1.1 || 1.1 || 0.4 || 1.5 || 10.4
|-
| align="left" | Career
| align="left" | 2 years, 2 teams
| 57 || 16 || 19.7 || .445 || .389 || .792 || 1.7 || 1.0 || 0.8 || 0.3 || 1.1 || 7.0

See also
 List of Australian WNBA players
 WNBL Most Valuable Player Award, (season 1999–00)
 WNBL Rookie of the Year Award, (season 1990)
 WNBL Top Shooter Award, (season 1999–00)
 WNBL All-Star Five, (seasons 1996, 1997, 1999–00 & 2004–05)

References

External links
WNBA player profile
16 February 2005 article
21 June 2005 press release on Fallon's association with Group Event Travel

1972 births
Living people
Australian expatriate basketball people in Spain
Australian expatriate basketball people in the United States
Australian women's basketball players
Basketball players at the 1996 Summer Olympics
Basketball players at the 2000 Summer Olympics
Basketball players at the 2004 Summer Olympics
Medalists at the 1996 Summer Olympics
Medalists at the 2000 Summer Olympics
Medalists at the 2004 Summer Olympics
Minnesota Lynx draft picks
Minnesota Lynx players
Olympic basketball players of Australia
Olympic bronze medalists for Australia
Olympic medalists in basketball
Olympic silver medalists for Australia
Phoenix Mercury players
Small forwards